The 1938 FIFA World Cup qualification Group 6 took place from January to March 1938. Hungary as the strongest team of this group was seeded. Greece and Mandatory Palestine would play against each other on a home-and-away basis. Hungary would play against the winner at home. The winner would qualify for the third FIFA World Cup held in France.

Matches

Mandatory Palestine vs Greece

Greece vs Mandatory Palestine

Hungary vs Greece

Team stats

Head coach:  Károly Dietz

Head coach:  Kostas Negrepontis (first and second match);  Alan Buckett (third match)

Head coach:  Egon Pollak

References

External links
FIFA official page
RSSSF - 1938 World Cup Qualification
Allworldcup

6
1937–38 in Mandatory Palestine football
1937–38 in Greek football
1937–38 in Hungarian football